Acanthodactylus boueti, also known commonly as  Chabanaud's fringe-fingered lizard, is a species of lizard in the family Lacertidae. The species is native to West Africa.

Etymology
The specific name, boueti, is in honor of French physician and ornithologist Georges Bouet (1869–1957), who worked in French West Africa in 1906–1930.

Geographic range
A. boueti is found in Benin, Ghana, Nigeria, and Togo.

Habitat

Reproduction
A. boueti is oviparous.

References

Further reading
Chabanaud P (1917). "Énumération des Reptiles non encore étudiés de l'Afrique occidentale, appartenant aux Collections du Muséum, avec la description des espèces nouvelles ". Bulletin du Muséum National d'Histoire Naturelle, Paris 23: 83–105. (Acanthodactylus boueti, new species, pp. 87–93, Figures 1–4). (in French).
Salvador, Alfredo (1982). "A revision of the lizards of the genus Acanthodactylus (Sauria: Lacertidae)". Bonner Zoologische Monographien (16): 1–167. (Acanthodactylus boueti, pp. 73–76, Figures 33–35). (in English, with an abstract in German).
Trape, Jean-François; Trape, Sébastien; Chirio, Laurent (2012). Lézards, crocodiles et tortues d'Afrique occidentale et du Sahara. Paris: IRD Orstom. 503 pp. . (in French).

Acanthodactylus
Lacertid lizards of Africa
Reptiles of West Africa
Reptiles of Nigeria
Reptiles described in 1917
Taxa named by Paul Chabanaud